João António Antunes Carvalho (born 9 March 1997) is a Portuguese professional footballer who plays as an attacking midfielder for Estoril on loan from Super League Greece club Olympiacos.

Club career

Benfica
Born in Castanheira de Pera, Leiria District, Carvalho joined S.L. Benfica's youth system as an 8-year-old. On 11 January 2015, still a junior, he made his professional debut with their B team, coming on as a late substitute in a 3–2 home win against FC Porto B in the Segunda Liga.

On 8 January 2017, Carvalho scored twice in a 3–2 home victory over Vitória S.C. B. Late in that month, he signed with Vitória F.C. on a half-year loan deal. He made his Primeira Liga debut with the latter on 5 February, replacing João Amaral late into the second half of an eventual 2–1 away loss to F.C. Arouca. He scored his first goal in the competition on 19 March, helping to a 1–1 draw against FC Porto at the Estádio do Dragão.

Carvalho made his competitive debut for Benfica's first team on 14 October 2017, featuring ten minutes in a 1–0 away defeat of S.C. Olhanense in the Taça de Portugal. His UEFA Champions League bow took place on 5 December, when he started the 0–2 group-stage home defeat against FC Basel.

Nottingham Forest
On 14 June 2018, Carvalho signed a five-year contract with EFL Championship side Nottingham Forest for a club-record transfer fee of £13.2m (€15 million). He scored his first goal for them on 19 September in a 2–1 home win against Sheffield Wednesday, finishing his first season with a further three as well as eight assists in a final ninth position.

Carvalho struggled to make an impact during his second year. Following a pre-season injury, he did make a bright return by scoring a goal in a 3–0 victory over arch-rivals Derby County in the second round of the EFL Cup. However, he was largely limited to substitute appearances by Sabri Lamouchi, making only nine starts as the manager was reportedly frustrated by the player's lack of determination to improve his performances in training when he was left out of the starting eleven.

On 29 September 2020, Carvalho was loaned to UD Almería, with the Spanish Segunda División club having an option to make the deal permanent.

Olympiacos
On 29 January 2022, Carvalho joined Olympiacos F.C. for an undisclosed fee. He scored in 1–1 Super League Greece home draws against AEK Athens F.C. and PAOK FC, helping his team to win their 47th national championship (third in a row).

Carvalho was loaned to G.D. Estoril Praia for the 2022–23 campaign.

Career statistics

Club

Honours
Olympiacos
Super League Greece: 2021–22

References

External links

1997 births
Living people
Sportspeople from Leiria District
Portuguese footballers
Association football midfielders
Primeira Liga players
Liga Portugal 2 players
S.L. Benfica B players
Vitória F.C. players
S.L. Benfica footballers
G.D. Estoril Praia players
English Football League players
Nottingham Forest F.C. players
Segunda División players
UD Almería players
Super League Greece players
Super League Greece 2 players
Olympiacos F.C. players
Olympiacos F.C. B players
Portugal youth international footballers
Portugal under-21 international footballers
Portuguese expatriate footballers
Expatriate footballers in England
Expatriate footballers in Spain
Expatriate footballers in Greece
Portuguese expatriate sportspeople in England
Portuguese expatriate sportspeople in Spain
Portuguese expatriate sportspeople in Greece